Pipunculus hertzogi is a species of fly in the family Pipunculidae.

Distribution
United States. Not Found in Europe as previously reported.

References

Pipunculidae
Insects described in 1943
Diptera of North America